Swift Current—Maple Creek—Assiniboia was a federal electoral district in Saskatchewan, Canada, that was represented in the House of Commons of Canada from 1988 to 1997.

This riding was created in 1987 from parts of Swift Current—Maple Creek and Assiniboia ridings.

The electoral district was abolished in 1996 when it was redistributed into Cypress Hills—Grasslands, Palliser and Souris—Moose Mountain ridings.

Electoral history

|-

|Progressive Conservative
|Geoff Wilson
|align=right| 15,944 
|align=right|44.0   

|New Democratic Party
|Laura Balas
|align=right|11,827 
|align=right|32.7   

|Liberal 
|Paul Lewans
|align=right|7,958 
|align=right|22.0  

|Liberal 
|Rob Heinrichs
|align=right|10,661
|align=right|32.4   

|New Democratic Party
|Lois Ross
|align=right| 5,448 
|align=right|16.5   

|Progressive Conservative
|Geoff Wilson
|align=right|5,119
|align=right|15.5    

|Natural Law
|Shirley Wilson
|align=right|216 
|align=right|0.7

See also 

 List of Canadian federal electoral districts
 Past Canadian electoral districts

External links 
 

Former federal electoral districts of Saskatchewan